The Otokar Keršovani Prize is a life achievement award for Journalism in Croatia, administered by the Croatian Journalists' Association. The award is decided by a jury, i. e. by two-thirds majority vote of the attending members. The award consists of an acknowledgment and monetary amount.

Winners
1965/1966 Mirko Peršen
1966/1967 
1967/1968 Neda Krmpotić
1968/1969 
1969/1970 Joško Palavršić
1970/1971 
1971/1972 not assigned
1972/1973 
1973/1974 Zvonko Kristl
1974/1975 Šime Mihovilović
1975/1976 Mladen Delić
1976/1977 Drago Bobić
1977/1978 Marko Vojković
1978/1979 Ivo Braut, Risto Krunić, Stevo Ostojić
1979/1980 Ivan Filipović, Frane Jurić, 
1980/1981 Branko Knezoci, Stjepan Tucak, Miljenko Smoje
1981/1982 Milan Bekić, Ante Kesić
1982/1983 Drago Auguštin, Tomo Đurinović, 
1983/1984 Ante Gavranović, Filip Svetić, Žarko Božić
1984/1985 Darko Grubačević, Josip Grubišić-Ćabo, 
1985/1986 Željko Brihta, Emil Piršl, Josip Šmit
1986/1987 , Joško Kulušić, Ivo Strahonja
1987/1988 
1988/1989 Živko Vnuk
1989/1990 Mira Boglić
1990/1991 
1991/1992 Alojz Ševčik
1993 
1993 Krešimir Džeba (posthumously)
1994 
1995 Bože V. Žigo
1996 Mirjana Rakić 
1997 Veljko Vičević
1998 
1999 Jovan Hovan
2000 
2001 Branko Lentić
2002 
2003 
2004 
2005 Igor Mandić 
2006 
2007 Inoslav Bešker 
2008 
2009 Milan Gavrović
2010 
2011 
2012 Giga Gračan
2013 Branko Šuljić
2014 Drago Hedl
2015 
2016 
2017 
2018 Sanja Modrić
2019 
2020 Mato Jerkić

Sources 
Nagrade HND

References

External links
 

Journalism awards